The Squire is a fictional character in the framing narrative of Geoffrey Chaucer's Canterbury Tales.  He is squire to (and son of) the Knight and is the narrator of The Squire's Tale or Cambuscan. 
The Squire is one of the secular pilgrims, of the military group (The Squire, The Knight and The Yeoman).  The Knight and the Squire are the pilgrims with the highest social status.  However his tale, interrupted as it is, is paired with that of the Franklin.  The Squire (along with The Shipman and The Summoner) is a candidate for the interrupter of The Host in the epilogue of the Man of Law's Tale.

The Squire is the second pilgrim described in the General Prologue.  His tale is told eleventh, after the Merchant and before the Franklin – the first of group F, and considered by modern scholars one of the marriage tales.

Description

The Squire is described in the General Prologue lines 79- 100:

Status
The squire is the normally the knight's servant.  He travels everywhere with the knight and does what is asked of him.  Nonetheless, he is also the Knight's son and represents, with the knight, the noble class, and the warrior class.  Chaucer was familiar with both, having fought in the Hundred Years' War, and been active as a courtier and diplomat, and indeed having served as a squire.

As a warrior
For a young man "as fresh as the month of May," the squire has quite extensive military experience.  He has been on chevauchée with his father in Flanders, Artois and Picardy; a chevauchée was a fast, aggressive raiding campaign undertaken by mounted soldiers which could last anywhere from a month to two years.  Chaucer notes that the squire has done good service for one so young (""), in hope to "" (win his lady's favour).

Clothing
In regards to being fashionable, the Squire is not only dressed in the finest clothes but also mounted on his horse rather well.  "He was embroidered like a meadow bright" which (at the time) was a sign of highest class.  In addition, his clothes are described in further detail in that "short was his gown, the sleeves were long and wide," which again was the fashion of the day.

His clothes are in contrast to the Knight's which are stained by his armour.

Courtly skills
Even the Squire's horsemanship was fashionable:  "He knew the way to sit a horse and ride."  In addition, he had skills fashionable for a  young man at the time: jousting, dancing, singing, writing and drawing.

As a lover
The young Squire is in love with love. This amorous concept is taken further at the end of the Squire's description:  "." ("Nyghtertale" – the duration of night.)

The squire as a story teller
Donald Roy Howard describes him as "endearing in his earnest but unsuccessful attempt to match his father's accomplishments as a storyteller".  The Squire is exceedingly long-winded, taking some four hundred lines to come to the start for his tale proper.  Despite his disclaimers he uses many rhetorical flourishes.  Presumably the slow pace is the reason the Franklin interrupts him.

The Franklin is doubtless poking gentle fun with his tale of the naive squire Aurelias.

Imagery
The springtime imagery from the beginning of the General Prologue re-emerges in the description of the Squire.

Feminist theory and queer theory
Susan Schibanoff asserts that the Squire's feminization should make him a prime target for patriarchal disapprobation.  The apparent inability to perceive the Squire's enslavement to females, and consequent emasculation, she says, is  contrary to the model (Hansen's) which opposes courtliness to patriarchy as diametrical opposites.

Further Schibanoff contends that the Squire's feminization is exonerated not because of the lack of homoerotic overtones, but because it is alibied by the Pardoner.  Thus Chaucer "appropriates the queer other" of the Pardoner to authorise the Squire's "feminized markers of power."

Sources and influences
The Romance of the Rose is widely considered to be a major source for the Squire, meeting all the requirements the god set out for his lover.  Other possible sources include the Roman de Troie of Benoit de Ste. Maure.

Chaucer's memory of his younger self as a page and squire, is a natural source, this identification may be extended by considering the Squire as a personification of Chaucer.  He is indeed, the only poet in the group, and his protestations of his own limited poetical powers, mirror and indeed self-parody Chaucer's own.

References

Further reading
 Laura Hodges, Chaucer and Costume: The Secular Pilgrims in the General Prologue CUP, 2000

Chaucer and gender
 Chaucer's Queer Nation, Glenn Burger, 2004, University of Minnesota Press. 
 
 Chaucer's Sexual Politics, C. M. Rose, Modern Language Quarterly, v51 n1 (1990-0301): 90-96
 

The Canterbury Tales
Fictional squires